

Statistics 
See COVID-19 pandemic in Poland for the cumulative lab-confirmed case count/deaths/recoveries graph shown as a horizontal bar graph; and for a daily cases/deaths/recoveries graph.

Detailed graphs for active cases, daily cases/deaths/recoveries   
September 1 – New way of testing and quarantine
December 2 – Rapid COVID-19 antigen tests introduced for patients

Detailed graphs for active cases vs recoveries   

New cases per day reported

7-day average

New recovered by day reported

New deaths by day reported

Tests per day

total number of people vaccinated
(Vaccinations started in Jan 2021)

Detailed case and deaths counts
Detail data in separate page

COVID-19 pandemic in Poland
Poland